Brezje is a former village in central Slovenia in the Municipality of Škofljica. It is now part of the village of Smrjene. It is part of the traditional region of Lower Carniola and is now included in the Central Slovenia Statistical Region.

Geography
Brezje is a clustered settlement located in the northwest part of the territory of Smrjene, at the top of Brezje Hill.

Name
The name Brezje is shared with several other places in Slovenia. It is derived from the Slovene common noun brezje 'birch grove', referring to the local vegetation.

History
Brezje was annexed by Smrjene in 1953, ending its existence as a separate settlement.

References

External links

Brezje on Geopedia

Populated places in the Municipality of Škofljica
Former settlements in Slovenia